MacMaster (also Macmaster, McMaster) is a Scottish surname, and may refer to:

People 
 Allan MacMaster (born 1974) Canadian politician
 Buddy MacMaster (1924–2014), Canadian musician, uncle of Natalie MacMaster
 Daniel MacMaster (1968–2008), Canadian rock singer
 Sir Donald Macmaster, 1st Baronet (1846–1922), Canadian politician
 Erasmus D. McMaster (1806–1866), American theologian
 Greg MacMaster (born 1962), member of the Michigan House of Representatives
 James McMaster (1820–1886), 19th-century American newspaper editor, changed spelling from MacMaster to appeal to Irish readers
 Ken MacMaster (born 1934), Canadian politician
 Mary Macmaster (born 1955), Scottish musician
 Natalie MacMaster (born 1972), Canadian fiddler

Fictional people 

 Alan MacMasters, fictional subject of a Wikipedia hoax claiming him to have invented the toaster

See also
 MacMaster (disambiguation)
 McMaster (disambiguation)